"Bodyshakin'" is a song by English boy band 911, released as the fifth single from their debut studio album, The Journey (1997). Released on 21 April 1997, it peaked at number three on the UK Singles Chart and remained in the chart for seven weeks. It also reached number 67 in Australia and number 19 in New Zealand. As of 2013, it has sold over 200,000 copies in the UK, allowing it to receive a silver sales certification.

Charts

Weekly charts

Year-end charts

Certifications

References

1997 singles
1997 songs
911 (English group) songs
EMI Records singles
Number-one singles in Scotland
Virgin Records singles